I. orientalis  may refer to:
 Idastrandia orientalis, a jumping spider species endemic to Singapore
 Iris orientalis, an Iris from Turkey and Greece

Synonyms
 Iguanodon orientalis, a synonym for Altirhinus, an ornithopod dinosaur species from the Early Cretaceous Period of Mongolia

See also
 Orientalis (disambiguation)